Malabar Road is a major arterial road in Palm Bay and Malabar, Florida. However, the name can refer to two routes:

 Florida State Road 514
 County Road 514 (Brevard County, Florida)

Roads in Brevard County, Florida